Adaiah was the name of eight individuals mentioned in the Hebrew Bible. The name means "Yahweh passes by."

Adaiah, the father of Queen Jedidah. He was of Boscath, a town in the Kingdom of Judah mentioned in the Hebrew Scriptures. His grandson was king Josiah of Israel.

References 

Set index articles on Hebrew Bible people